The term baioulos was used in the Byzantine Empire to refer to a preceptor or tutor of imperial princes. Only a handful of holders are known, but due to the office's close proximity to the imperial family, and the ties it created with future emperors, a number of baiouloi were among the most important officials of their time.

Origin and history
The term derives from the Latin term baiulus ("bearer"), which by the 4th century came to mean "nurse" or "preceptor". Thus in the 12th century the theologian Theodore Balsamon claimed that it came from baïon (βαΐον, palm leaf) because the preceptor was charged with supervising the growth of young minds. The term was rarely used, and only in Byzantine times; it is not attested in Modern Greek. The 13th-century scholar Manuel Moschopoulos offers the equivalent, well-established Greek terms παιδαγωγός and παιδοτρίβης.

The term was applied to the tutors and preceptors of imperial princes, who enjoyed a rather extensive authority. As Vitalien Laurent writes, he was not only "charged with instruction and education, but all that which is needed to assist the child to become, physically and intellectually, a man". The office brought its holders in close contact with the imperial family, and the bond created between a baioulos and his pupil could lead to significant political influence. It is not a coincidence that two of the handful of holders known, Antiochus in the 5th century and Basil Lekapenos in the 10th, rose to be all-powerful chief ministers under their respective wards, while even the others appear to have played an important political role. Basil Lekapenos in particular received the even more elevated title of megas baioulos (μέγας βαΐουλος, "grand preceptor"), which may thereafter have existed alongside several junior baiouloi.

Despite its importance, the office is entirely absent from early and middle Byzantine handbooks on imperial offices and ceremonies, until the 14th century. Pseudo-Kodinos, writing after the middle of the 14th century, did not know where the megas baioulos was to be ranked in the Byzantine hierarchy, but other contemporary lists of offices, such as the appendix to the Hexabiblos and the verse list of Matthew Blastares, which reflected the usage under Andronikos II Palaiologos or during the reign of Andronikos III Palaiologos, place him in the 18th place, after the parakoimomenos tou koitonos and before the kouropalates. Ernst Stein proposed that the baioulos was replaced by the tatas tes aules, but this conjecture was rejected by Laurent.

List of known holders

References

Sources
 
 
 
 

Byzantine court titles